Charlotte Gordon is an American writer, distinguished professor of humanities at Endicott College, and winner of the National Book Critics Circle Award in nonfiction for her book Romantic Outlaws: The Extraordinary Lives of Mary Wollstonecraft and Mary Shelley (2015).

She was born in St. Louis, Missouri in 1962, and received her B.A in English and American Literature from Harvard College. She received her M.A in Creative Writing and her Ph.D in Literature from Boston University.

She was awarded the Massachusetts Book Award for non-fiction for her biography of the seventeenth-century poet, Anne Bradstreet, Mistress Bradstreet: The Untold Life of America's First Poet. This was followed by The Woman Who Named God: Abraham's Dilemma and the Birth of Three Faiths, which in the author's own words describes the "shadows, gaps and silences" in the biblical texts about Abraham, Sarah and Hagar. Examining them as stories, and drawing on the Bible both as a source of literature and religion, she notes that "some of the most crucial western ideas about freedom come from Hagar".

Her most recent book, Romantic Outlaws: The Extraordinary Lives of Mary Wollstonecraft and Mary Shelley (2015), is about the mother and daughter pair of writers.  The first Mary died giving birth to the second in 1797, and The Guardian said that the biography did a creditable job of binding them together again. It was favourably reviewed in The Wall Street Journal as well. Romantic Outlaws was the BBC Radio 4 Book of the Week on August 10, 2015, and won the 2016 National Book Critics Circle Award.

See also
Lyndall Gordon, also a literary biographer of Wollstonecraft (2005) and of mother-daughter pairs

References

External links 
 Charlotte Gordon's website 
 Little, Brown's author page 
 NPR interview 
 CBC Radio interview 

21st-century American women writers
Living people
Harvard College alumni
Boston University College of Arts and Sciences alumni
Endicott College faculty
American women non-fiction writers
21st-century American non-fiction writers
Year of birth missing (living people)
Mary Wollstonecraft scholars